Prostanthera suborbicularis is a species of flowering plant in the family Lamiaceae and is endemic to Queensland. It is a shrub with broadly elliptical to round leaves.

Description
Prostanthera suborbicularis is a shrub or undershrub that has its branches and leaves covered with short, matted hairs.

Taxonomy and naming
Prostanthera suborbicularis was first formally described in 1926 by Cyril Tenison White and William Douglas Francis in the Proceedings of the Royal Society of Queensland from specimens collected near Adavale.

Distribution
This mint bush grows in Queensland.

Conservation status
This mintbush is listed as of "least concern" under the Queensland Government Nature Conservation Act 1992.

References

suborbicularis
Flora of Queensland
Lamiales of Australia
Plants described in 1926
Taxa named by Cyril Tenison White
Taxa named by William Douglas Francis